Jerrold Martin North (December 8, 1931 - August 27, 2006) was a US Army officer and a diplomat, who served as United States Ambassador to Djibouti.

Biography
North briefly attended the University of Illinois before entering West Point, Class of 1954.  When he graduated, North joined the Field Artillery and then spent two years with the 82nd Airborne Division. Afterwards, he served nine months at Fort Sill where he was a member of the first surface-to-surface missile course. He was assigned to the 3rd Infantry Division and the 10th Infantry Division as a battery executive officer; and received his master's degree during that time. He resigned the Army in 1963 to enter the Foreign Service.

Foreign Service
North was appointed a Foreign Service officer in November 1963. During his career before becoming ambassador, he served in Somalia, Vietnam, and Belgium.

Jimmy Carter appointed North to be the first American Ambassador to Djibouti, where he served from 1980 until 1982.

Personal life
North married Gayle Adele von Plonski in June 1959.

References

External links
 Jerrold Martin North at the Office of the Historian

1931 births
2006 deaths
Military personnel from Chicago
United States Military Academy alumni
United States Foreign Service personnel
Ambassadors of the United States to Djibouti
University of Illinois alumni
University of Alabama alumni
20th-century American diplomats